The 1933–34 season was the 61st season of competitive football in Scotland and the 44th season of the Scottish Football League.

Scottish League Division One 

Champions: Rangers
Relegated: Third Lanark, Cowdenbeath

Scottish League Division Two 

Promoted: Albion Rovers, Dunfermline Athletic

Scottish Cup 

Division One champions Rangers were winners of the Scottish Cup final after a 5–0 final win over St Mirren.

Other honours

National

County 

 – aggregate over two legs

Highland League

Junior Cup 
Benburb were winners of the Junior Cup after a 3–1 win over Bridgeton Waverley in the final.

Scotland national team 

Key:
 (H) = Home match
 (A) = Away match
 BHC = British Home Championship

Notes and references

External links 
 Scottish Football Historical Archive

 
Seasons in Scottish football